In 2019 the following events occurred in science fiction.

Deaths
 April 1 – Vonda N. McIntyre, American writer (born 1948)
 Erik Olin Wright, sociologist and futurologist
 Yuri Artsutanov, pioneer of the space elevator idea
 Carol Emshwiller, writer

Literary releases

Novels
 The City in the Middle of the Night by Charlie Jane Anders
 Ancestral Night by Elizabeth Bear
 The Light Brigade by Kameron Hurley
 Luna: Moon Rising by Ian McDonald
 Tiamat's Wrath by James S. A. Corey
 Motherland by Lauren Beukes
 English translation of The Waste Tide by Chen Qiufan
 Exhalation: Stories by Ted Chiang
 Children of Ruin by Adrian Tchaikovsky
 Wanderers by Chuck Wendig
 Dark Age by Pierce Brown
 English translation of The Redemption of Time by Baoshu
 Vigilance by Robert Jackson Bennett
 Hierophant by Robert Jackson Bennett
 The Testaments by Margaret Atwood
 The Future of Another Timeline by Annalee Newitz
 Famous Men Who Never Lived by K Chess
 The Lesson by Cadwell Turnbull
 A Memory Called Empire by Arkady Martine
 This Is How You Lose the Time War by Amal El-Mohtar and Max Gladstone
 Alliance Rising by C. J. Cherryh and Jane S. Fancher
 Perihelion Summer by Greg Egan
 Permafrost by Alastair Reynolds
 Do You Dream of Terra-Two? by Temi Oh
 The Last Astronaut by David Wellington
 A Song for a New Day by Sarah Pinsker
 Here and Now and Then by Mike Chen

Stories collections
 American Science Fiction: Eight Classic Novels of the 1960s by Gary K. Wolfe (ed.)
 Broken Stars: Contemporary Chinese Science Fiction in Translation by Ken Liu (ed.)

Films

Original

 3022
 9
 Ad Astra
 Alita: Battle Angel
 The Blackout
 Boss Level
 Brightburn
 Captive State
 Chaos Walking
 Doraemon: Nobita's Chronicle of the Moon Exploration
 Escape Room
 Farmageddon: A Shaun the Sheep Movie
 Fast & Furious Presents: Hobbs & Shaw
 Fast Color
 Gemini Man
 Goalkeeper of the Galaxy
 Happy Death Day 2U
 I Am Mother
 Io
 Kabaneri of the Iron Fortress: The Battle of Unato
 Kizhakku Africavil Raju
 Lucy in the Sky
 Princess Principal
 Psycho-Pass: Sinners of the System
 Relive
 Serenity
 Short Circuit
 Spies in Disguise
 The Last Boy
 Paradise Hills
 Proxima
 Ultraman R/B the Movie
 The Vast of Night
 The Wandering Earth
 Warriors of Future

Sequels, spin-offs and remakes

 Avengers: Endgame
 Captain Marvel
 Code 8
 Code Geass: Lelouch of the Re;surrection
 Glass
 Godzilla: King of the Monsters
 Hellboy
 Iron Sky: The Coming Race
 The Lego Movie 2: The Second Part
 Men in Black: International
 Pokémon: Detective Pikachu
 Reign of the Supermen
 Sonic the Hedgehog
 Spider-Man: Far From Home
 Star Wars: The Rise of Skywalker
 Terminator: Dark Fate
 Shazam!
 X-Men: Dark Phoenix

Television

New series
 My Absolute Boyfriend
 The Boys
 Doom Patrol
 Gen:Lock
 Good Omens
 His Dark Materials
 The I-Land
 Memories of the Alhambra
 October Faction
 The Passage
 Project Blue Book
 Roswell, New Mexico
 See
 Snowpiercer
 Star Trek: Picard
 Star Wars: The Mandalorian
 Swamp Thing
 The War of the Worlds (British TV series)
 The War of the Worlds (American TV series)
 Warrior Nun
 Watchmen
 Weird City

Returning series
 The 100, season 6
 3%, season 3
 Black Mirror, season 5
 Cloak & Dagger, season 2
 Cosmos: Possible Worlds
 Dark, season 2
 The Expanse, season 4
 The Handmaid's Tale, season 3
 Jessica Jones, season 3
 Kishiryu Sentai Ryusoulger
 Krypton, season 2
 Legion, season 3
 Nightflyers, season 2
 Power Rangers Beast Morphers
 The Orville, season 2
 The Punisher, season 2
 Runaways, season 2
 She-Ra and the Princesses of Power, season 2
 Star Trek: Discovery, season 2
 Stranger Things, season 3
 Super Sentai Strongest Battle
 The Twilight Zone
 Transformers: Rescue Bots Academy
 Ultraman
 Ultraman New Generation Chronicle
 Van Helsing, season 4
 Young Justice, season 3

Video games

 Anthem
 Apex Legends 
 Control
 Crackdown 3
 Gears 5
 Halo Infinite
 Marvel's Spider-Man
 The Outer Worlds
 Rebel Galaxy Outlaw
 Star Wars Jedi: Fallen Order
 The Surge 2

Awards
 Sorry to Bother You made it onto the list of Top Ten Independent Films of 2018 by the National Board of Review of Motion Pictures

Other events
 Mir Fantastiki magazine was relaunched by the new publisher, Hobby World.

References

See also

Science fiction by year
2019 in the arts
2019-related lists